The Juntura Formation is a geologic formation in Oregon. It preserves fossils dating back to the Neogene period.

Fossil content

Mammals

Carnivorans

Eulipotyphlans

See also

 List of fossiliferous stratigraphic units in Oregon
 Paleontology in Oregon

References

 

Neogene geology of Oregon